Drum Taps may refer to:

 Drum-Taps, an 1865 collection of poetry by Walt Whitman
 Drum Taps (film), a 1933 film starring Ken Maynard and Dorothy Dix
 Drum Taps (horse), a Thoroughbred racehorse